The Sanremo Music Festival 1970 was the 20th annual Sanremo Music Festival, held at the Sanremo Casino in Sanremo, province of Imperia between 26 and 28 February 1970. The final night was broadcast by Rai 1, while the first two nights were broadcast live only by radio. The show was presented by Nuccio Costa, assisted by the actors Enrico Maria Salerno and Princess Ira von Fürstenberg.

According to the rules of this edition every song  was performed in a double performance by a couple of singers or groups.
The winners of the Festival were Adriano Celentano and Claudia Mori with the song "Chi non lavora non fa l'amore".

Participants and results

References 

Sanremo Music Festival by year
1970 in Italian music
1970 music festivals